The Legend of Sword and Fairy 5 Prequel, also known as Sword and Fairy 5 Prequel or Chinese Paladin 5 Prequel, is a xianxia-themed fantasy adventure role-playing video game developed by Taiwanese game company Softstar Entertainment's Beijing subsidiary. It is the seventh installment in The Legend of Sword and Fairy video game series, and is the direct prequel of The Legend of Sword and Fairy 5, set about 25 years before the plot of the latter.

References

External links
  Official The Legend of Sword and Fairy website
  Official The Legend of Sword and Fairy 5 Prequel website (Mainland)  
  Softstar's website
  Official Chinese Paladin Online website

5 Prequel
2013 video games
Chinese-language-only video games
Fantasy video games
Interquel video games
Role-playing video games
Single-player video games
Video games based on Chinese mythology
Video games developed in Taiwan
Video games set in Imperial China
Video games with isometric graphics
Windows-only games
Windows games